Silvolde (West Low German: Sillevolde) is a village in the Achterhoek and is part of the municipality Oude IJsselstreek.

School
There are several schools in Silvolde, those are:
de Plakkenberg (elementary school)
de Drie Linden (elementary school)
de Bontebrugschool (elementary school)
Bluemers (high school)
Laudis (high school)
Isala (high school)

Notable people from Silvolde
Wim Mager (1940-2008), director of the Apenheul Primate Park
Arne Jansen (1951-2007), Dutch singer

Gallery

References

External information 
 Old Sillevold - Hymnical association from Silvolde (dutch)

Populated places in Gelderland
Oude IJsselstreek